Said Karam is a district in Paktia Province, Afghanistan. The main town in the district is Khandkhel. The district is within the heartland of the Muqbil tribe of Pashtuns. Villages in the Said Karam district are Khandkhel (خڼخیل), Khunderkhel (کندر خیل), Goud Qala Mangal (ګډقلعه منګل), Chino Klalai (چینو کلا), Shaiyesta Kalay (شایسته کلا) and Shaikhan Kalay (توتاخېل)

Demographics & population
No exact population numbers are available. The Afghan Ministry of Rural Rehabilitation & Development (MRRD) along with UNHCR and Central Statistics Office (CSO) of Afghanistan estimated the population of the district to be around 42,967 (CSO 2004).

Notable people
Mohammad Najibullah, President of Afghanistan from 1987 to 1992
Mohammad Ashraf Naseri

See also
Khandkhel

References

Districts of Paktia Province